The World Xiangqi Championship is organised by the World Xiangqi Federation (WXF) and is held every two years since 1991. The inaugural edition took place in 1990 in Singapore.

List of winners

See also 
 List of world championships in mind sports
 World Mind Games

References

Jean-Louis Cazaux. "The Xiangqi Champions".
Hall of fame. European Xiangqi Federation.

External links
 World Xiangqi Federation

Xiangqi
Recurring sporting events established in 1990
Xiangqi competitions